Slieverue GAA is a Gaelic Athletic Association club located in Slieverue, County Kilkenny, Ireland. The club was founded in 1884 and fields teams in hurling and Gaelic football.

Honours
 Kilkenny Senior Club Hurling Championships: (1) 1954
 Kilkenny Intermediate Hurling Championships: (1) 1936
 Kilkenny Junior Hurling Championships: (1) 1950

Notable players
 Paddy Buggy
 Locky Byrne

External links
 Slieverue GAA website

Gaelic games clubs in County Kilkenny
Hurling clubs in County Kilkenny
Gaelic football clubs in County Kilkenny
1884 establishments in Ireland